Vishnu Sharan Dublish (1895-1986) was an Indian politician. He was a Member of Parliament, representing Sardhana, Uttar Pradesh in the Lok Sabha the lower house of India's Parliament as a member of the Indian National Congress. He was also a member of the Constituent Assembly of India. He was a student of Church Mission High School and Meerut College.

References

External links
Official biographical sketch in Parliament of India website

1895 births
1986 deaths
Lok Sabha members from Uttar Pradesh
Indian National Congress politicians
India MPs 1957–1962
Members of the Constituent Assembly of India
Indian National Congress politicians from Uttar Pradesh